The Christian Social Party (CSP) was a Dutch Christian socialist political party. The CSP played only a minor role in Dutch politics and is historically linked to the Labour Party.

Party history
The CSP was founded in 1907 by former members of the conservative reformed Christian Historical Union. In the 1918 elections, the first election with a system of proportional representation and male universal suffrage the restriction to get into the Tweede Kamer were relatively low, one needed more than half of a percentage of the vote to be elected. Consequently, the CSP was elected with only 8000 votes (that is .6% of vote). The CSP MP Van der Laar played only a minor role in Dutch politics. In the 1922 elections the restrictions to enter parliament where raised. The CSP was unable to maintain its seat. In the 1925 elections the party campaigned as  the Protestant People's Party (Dutch: Protestantse Volkspartij, PVP). In 1926 the CSP founded the Christian Democratic Union with former members of the Christian Democratic Party and the League of Christian Socialists.

Ideology and issues
CSP was both a social-democratic and a conservative Christian party. CSP was a reformist party and rejected class conflict. The party was anti-papist and rejected the cooperation between the Protestant Christian Historical Union and the Catholic General League.

Its program combined conservative Protestant proposals with social democratic ones. Among the social-democratic proposals were nationalization of core industries, workers' councils in companies and profit sharing. Among the conservative proposals was the proposal to financially privilege the Dutch Reformed Church to maintain the Protestant identity of the Netherlands. An interesting proposal, for the 1910s, was to enact legislation against the pollution of soils, water and air.

Representation
This table shows the election results of the CSP in elections to the House of Representatives, the Senate and the States-Provincial, as well as the party's political leadership: the fractievoorzitter, the chair of the parliamentary party and the lijsttrekker, the party's top candidate in the general election, these posts are normally taken by the party's leader.

Provincial and municipal government
The party held several seats in municipal legislatives and in the Gelderland, Friesland and Overijssel States Provincial.

Electorate
The CSP had only a limited support, which it drew Protestants from lower classes.

International comparison
The CSP is as Christian socialist party comparable to the members of the International League of Religious Socialists.

References

1907 establishments in the Netherlands
1926 disestablishments in the Netherlands
Christian socialist organizations
Confessional parties in the Netherlands
Defunct Christian political parties
Defunct socialist parties in the Netherlands
Labour Party (Netherlands)
Political parties disestablished in 1926
Political parties established in 1907
Protestant political parties
Social democratic parties in the Netherlands